North Royalton is a city in Cuyahoga County, Ohio, United States. It is a suburb of Cleveland. The population was 31,322 as of the 2020 Census. Originally incorporated as a village in 1927, it achieved the status of city in 1961.

History
North Royalton was founded in 1818. Knight Sprague, an early settler, had the township named after his native town in Vermont, Royalton. Sometime between 1880 and 1890, the name of Royalton was changed to North Royalton because of another town in Ohio bearing the same name. On April 4, 1927, the township officially became the Village of North Royalton, and the first mayor, E. C. McCombs, was elected.

Geography

Demographics

As of the census of 2000, there were 28,647 people, 11,250 households, and 7,695 families residing in the city. The population density was 1,345.9 people per square mile (519.5/km2). There were 11,754 housing units at an average density of 552.2 per square mile (213.2/km2). The racial makeup of the city was 96.18% White, 0.71%  African American, 0.12% Native American, 1.99% Asian, 0.02% Pacific Islander, 0.16% from other races, and 0.83% from two or more races. Hispanic or Latino of any race were 0.95% of the population.

There were 11,250 households, out of which 31.5% had children under the age of 18 living with them, 58.4% were married couples living together, 7.4% had a female householder with no husband present, and 31.6% were non-families. 26.7% of all households were made up of individuals, and 7.0% had someone living alone who was 65 years of age or older. The average household size was 2.51 and the average family size was 3.11. The average house cost about $210,000.00.

In the city the population was spread out, with 24.3% under the age of 18, 7.7% from 18 to 24, 30.6% from 25 to 44, 25.4% from 45 to 64, and 12.0% who were 65 years of age or older. The median age was 39 years. For every 100 females, there were 95.2 males. For every 100 females age 18 and over, there were 92.4 males.

The median income for a household in the city was $57,398, and the median income for a family was $69,983. Males had a median income of $46,764.00 versus $31,173.00 for females. The per capita income for the city was $26,610. About 1.2% of families and 2.3% of the population were below the poverty line, including 1.5% of those under age 18 and 3.5% of those age 65 or over.

Of the city's population over the age of 25, 32.9% hold a bachelor's degree or higher.

Languages

96.3% spoke English, 1.5% German, 1.3% Polish, and 0.9% Italian in their house.

2010 census
As of the census of 2010, there were 30,444 people, 12,944 households, and 8,220 families residing in the city. The racial makeup of the city was 94.6% White, 1.2% African American, 0.1% Native American, 2.8% Asian, 0.3% from other races, and 1.1% from two or more races. Hispanic or Latino of any race were 1.6% of the population.

There were 12,944 households, of which 26.5% had children under the age of 18 living with them, 52.5% were married couples living together, 7.9% had a female householder with no husband present, 3.1% had a male householder with no wife present, and 36.5% were non-families. 31.0% of all households were made up of individuals, and 10.1% had someone living alone who was 65 years of age or older. The average household size was 2.33 and the average family size was 2.97.

The median age in the city was 43.5 years. 20.1% of residents were under the age of 18; 7.7% were between the ages of 18 and 24; 24.3% were from 25 to 44; 32.7% were from 45 to 64; and 15.1% were 65 years of age or older. The gender makeup of the city was 48.8% male and 51.2% female.

Officials

 Mayor – Larry Antoskiewicz
President of Council - Paul Marnecheck
 Council, Ward 1 – Jessica Fenos
 Council, Ward 2 – Linda Barath
 Council, Ward 3 – Joanne Krejci
 Council, Ward 4 – Jeremy Dietrich
 Council, Ward 5 – Dawn Carbone-McDonald
 Council, Ward 6 – Mike Wos

Schools
The North Royalton School District serves approximately 4700 students in the communities of North Royalton and Broadview Hts.
 North Royalton Elementary School (Grades K–4)
 North Royalton Middle School (Grades 5–8)
 North Royalton High School (Grades 9–12)
Parochial schools
 St. Albert the Great School (K-8) 
 Royal Redeemer Lutheran School (K-8) 

The High School added a new 60,000 foot math and science wing that will be the replacement for the front 1950 section.

Library
North Royalton's public library is a branch of the Cuyahoga County Public Library (CCPL), the busiest per-capita system in the country. A new building to which all functions have been transferred opened in August 2013, is located two miles north of the city center at 5071 Wallings Road, North Royalton, Ohio. It was formerly located at 14600 State Road (OH-94) with North Royalton's Memorial Park almost adjacent to Route 82. Its website is part of the CCPL's website. The existing library structure was then converted into a new city hall facility, which opened to the public in 2015.

Notable people

 Chris Broussard – Former resident, ESPN NBA analyst

 Erich Gliebe - Former boxer and chairman of National Alliance.

 Matthew Kish - Jeapordy winner and teacher of American history and psychology at North Royalton High School

Surrounding communities
North Royalton is bordered by Parma and Middleburg Heights to the north, Broadview Heights to the east, Hinckley to the south, and Strongsville to the west.

References

External links
 City website
 Population estimates

Cities in Ohio
Cities in Cuyahoga County, Ohio
Populated places established in 1827
1827 establishments in Ohio